Clwyd South is a constituency of the Senedd. It elects one Member of the Senedd by the first past the post method of election. Also, however, it is one of nine constituencies in the North Wales electoral region, which elects four additional members, in addition to nine constituency members, to produce a degree of proportional representation for the region as a whole.

Boundaries 

The constituency was created for the first election to the then Assembly, in 1999, with the name and boundaries of the Clwyd South Westminster constituency. It is mostly within the preserved county of Clwyd and partly within the preserved county of Powys.

For the 2007 Assembly election, however, it became a constituency entirely within Clwyd. Part of its area was transferred to the Montgomeryshire constituency, in Powys.  Also, part of its area was transferred to another Clwyd constituency, Clwyd West. For Westminster purposes, the same boundary changes became effective at the 2010 United Kingdom general election.

As created in 1999, the North Wales region includes the constituencies of Alyn and Deeside, Caernarfon, Clwyd West, Clwyd South, Conwy, Delyn, Vale of Clwyd, Wrexham and Ynys Môn. For the 2007 election the region will include Aberconwy, Alyn and Deeside, Arfon, Clwyd South, Clwyd West, Delyn, Vale of Clwyd, Wrexham and Ynys Môn.

For the period 1999 to 2007, the Clwyd South constituency can be described as consisting of electoral divisions as follows:
 Within Denbighshire:
 Corwen, Llandrillo and Llangollen
 Within Wrexham:
 Bronington, Brymbo, Bryn Cefn, Cefn, Chirk North, Chirk South, Coedpoeth, Dyffryn Ceiriog/Ceiriog Valley, Esclusham, Gwenfro, Johnstown, Llangollen Rural, Marchwiel, Minera, New Broughton, Overton, Pant, Penycae, Penycae and Ruabon South, Plas Madoc, Ponciau and Ruabon

Voting 
In general elections for the Senedd, each voter has two votes. The first vote may be used to vote for a candidate to become the Member of the Senedd for the voter's constituency, elected by the first past the post system. The second vote may be used to vote for a regional closed party list of candidates. Additional member seats are allocated from the lists by the D'Hondt method, with constituency results being taken into account in the allocation.

Members of the Senedd

Constituency election results

Elections in the 2020s

Elections in the 2010s 

Regional ballots rejected: 172

Elections in the 2000s 

2003 Electorate: 53,452
Regional ballots rejected: 230

Elections in the 1990s

References 

Senedd constituencies in the North Wales electoral region
Clwyd
1999 establishments in Wales
Constituencies established in 1999